Socoro ( Socoro Hala) is a Manchu clan and surname in China. Socoro clan is a branch of Hešeri clan. The surname Suo (索), Cao (曹) and Shi (石) have been used for short for generations.

Notable figures

Males

Females
Imperial Consort
 Noble Consort
 Zhaoge (招格), Noble Consort Wan (1835–1894), the Xianfeng Emperor's imperial concubine

 Noble Lady
 Noble Lady Rui (d. 1765), the Qianlong Emperor's noble lady

Princess Consort
 Secondary Consort
 Yongqi's secondary consort, the mother of first son (1759), third son (1762–1763), fourth son (1764) and Mianyi (1764–1815)

See also
 List of Manchu clans

Manchu clans